Holy Cross Cemetery is a Catholic cemetery located in North Arlington, New Jersey, United States. Since its establishment in 1915, it has interred over 289,000 individuals. The cemetery operates under the supervision of the Archdiocese of Newark. By August 2013, the cemetery had provided burial or entombment facilities for 289,600 individuals.

History
The cemetery was established in 1915 and now has  used for graves or developed for interment.

There is another  allocated for development. The mausoleum is being expanded, creating 6,100 aboveground spaces for crypts and 920 niches for cremated remains. The completed building will have 35,747 interment spaces. It continues to offer ground for new graves as well as private and community Chapel Mausoleum facilities.

Notable interments
 Richard Boiardo, (1890–1984), gangster
 Dominick V. Daniels (1908–1987), represented New Jersey's 14th congressional district from 1959 to 1977.
 Sam Dente (1922–2002), Major League Baseball shortstop from 1947 to 1955.
 Archimedes Giacomantonio (1906–1988), sculptor
 Stephen R. Gregg (1914–2005), awarded Medal of Honor for gallantry during World War II
 James Hall (1900–1940), actor
 Maria Jeritza (1887–1982), opera singer
 John Gerald Milton (1881–1977), United States Senator from New Jersey.
 Nick Piantanida (1932–1966) First civilian space program. Attempted to sky dive from the edge of space at a record of 123,800 feet.
 Frank E. Rodgers (1909–2000), Mayor of Harrison, New Jersey for 48 years
 Ellen Tauscher (1951–2019), represented California's 10th congressional district from 1997 to 2009.
 Venus Xtravaganza (1965–1988), an American transgender performer, featured in Jennie Livingston's 1990 documentary film Paris Is Burning. Buried under her birth name, Thomas Pellagatti.

See also
 Bergen County Cemeteries

References

External links 
 Holy Cross Cemetery 
 Search for burials in the Archdiocese of Newark database
 Holy Cross Cemetery
 
 GraveInfo for Holy Cross Cemetery

Cemeteries in Bergen County, New Jersey
Roman Catholic cemeteries in New Jersey
Roman Catholic Archdiocese of Newark
North Arlington, New Jersey